The 2015–16 Sporting de Gijón season was the 41st season that the club will play in La Liga, the first after the promotion from Segunda División in the last season.

Season overview
In its return to La Liga three years later, Sporting continued sanctioned due to a delay in payments to players during the previous season. Sporting was only allowed to sign on loan three under-23 players.

Sporting started the season earning a point against Real Madrid. The club did not win its first game until the fourth round, when it defeated Deportivo La Coruña by 2–3 at Estadio Riazor with two goals of Antonio Sanabria and one of Álex Menéndez.

Sporting dropped to the relegation positions for the first time after the round 18. It was defeated 1–2 by Getafe. The club avoided the relegation in the last after winning 2–0 against Villarreal and taking advantage of the win of Real Betis against Getafe, which dropped finally to the 18th position.

Players

Current squad

Reserve team players

In

Out

Technical staff

Competitions

Pre-season and friendlies

La Liga

League table

Results summary

Positions by round

Matches

Copa del Rey

Statistics

Appearances and goals

|-
|colspan="12"|Players who have left the club after the start of the season:

Disciplinary record

|-
|colspan=14 align=left|Players who have left the club after the start of the season:

See also
2015–16 La Liga
2015–16 Copa del Rey

References

Sporting de Gijón seasons
Sporting de Gijon
2015–16 La Liga